Philipp Reinhard Vitriarius (17 February 1647 – 30 July 1720) was a jurist from Germany.

Vitriarius was born in Oppenheim and after his studies became a professor at Leiden University where his portrait hangs in the Rector's hall. His son Johann Jacob Vitriarius also studied there and took his place as professor, eventually publishing his writings in several volumes. For example: Philipus Reinhardus Vitrarius, Institutiones Juris Publici Romano-Germanici, (Lugd. Bataw.: Petrum Vander, 1686)

Vitriarius died in Leiden.

References

Vitriarius in Van der Aa

External links
 Vitriarius, profile at Leiden University

1647 births
1720 deaths
17th-century German lawyers
18th-century German lawyers
Jurists from Rhineland-Palatinate
Academic staff of Leiden University
People from Rhenish Hesse
Rectors of universities in the Netherlands
Academic staff of the University of Geneva
University of Strasbourg alumni